Kristina Fries (born August 20, 1962 in Jönköping) is a Swedish sport shooter. She competed at the Summer Olympics in 1984 and 1988. In 1984, she placed fifth in the women's 25 metre pistol event, and in 1988, she placed sixth in the women's 25 metre pistol event.

References

1962 births
Living people
ISSF pistol shooters
Swedish female sport shooters
Shooters at the 1984 Summer Olympics
Shooters at the 1988 Summer Olympics
Olympic shooters of Sweden
People from Jönköping
Sportspeople from Jönköping County
20th-century Swedish women